The Kolinbiné River is a river in West Africa. It arises in southern Mauritania and flows south, forming part of the international boundary between Mauritania and Mali. In Mali, it joins the Sénégal River 5 km upstream from the town of Kayes.

The river flows through a number of shallow depressions that fill with water during the short rainy season (July to September). The largest of these is Lake Magui that extends for nearly 30 km in a north–south direction.

References

Rivers of Mali
Rivers of Mauritania
International rivers of Africa
Mali–Mauritania border